The Morane-Saulnier V, also known as the Morane-Saulnier Type V was a French fighter of the 1910s.

Development
Developed in parallel with the Morane-Saulnier I, the Type V was similar to the I but was larger with a three-hour endurance. It also differed in that it had larger wing and deepened ventral contours to accommodate extra fuel tanks. An intended development fitted with ailerons was planned as the Morane-Saulnier U, but was not flown.

Operational history
Developed at the beginning of 1916, the Type V was intended primarily to meet a Royal Flying Corps requirement, and the service of the Type V was officially accepted in May 1916. However, like the Type I, the aircraft proved to be unpopular across-the-board and the Type V was retired from service only 5 months later. However, in 1917 18 aircraft were in service with the Imperial Russian Air Service (IRAS). It is believed that these were acquired by the Bolshevik Red Air Fleet during the Russian Revolution.

Operators
 
 Royal Flying Corps
 
 Imperial Russian Air Service
 
 Soviet Air Force - Aircraft taken from IRAS during Russian Revolution

Variants
Morane-Saulnier V company designation
MS.22 official French government STAe designation for the V

Specifications

References

Bibliography
Bruce, Jack. "The Bullets and the Guns". Air Enthusiast. Nine, February–May 1979. pp. 61–75.

Further reading

1910s French fighter aircraft
V
Rotary-engined aircraft
Shoulder-wing aircraft
Single-engined tractor aircraft
Aircraft first flown in 1916